How to Read a Book is a book by the American philosopher Mortimer J. Adler. Originally published in 1940, it was heavily revised for a 1972 edition, co-authored by Adler with editor Charles Van Doren. The 1972 revision gives guidelines for critically reading good and great books of any tradition. In addition, it deals with genres (including, but not limited to, poetry, history, science, and fiction), as well as inspectional and syntopical reading.

Overview of the 1972 edition
How to Read a Book is divided into four parts, each consisting of several chapters.

Part 1: The Dimensions of Reading
Here, Adler sets forth his method for reading a non-fiction book in order to gain understanding. He claims that three distinct approaches, or readings, must all be made in order to get the most possible out of a book, but that performing these three levels of readings does not necessarily mean reading the book three times, as the experienced reader will be able to do all three in the course of reading the book just once. Adler names the readings "structural", "interpretative", and "critical", in that order.

Structural Stage: The first stage of analytical reading is concerned with understanding the structure and purpose of the book. It begins with determining the basic topic and type of the book being read, so as to better anticipate the contents and comprehend the book from the very beginning. Adler says that the reader must distinguish between practical and theoretical books, as well as determining the field of study that the book addresses. Further, Adler says that the reader must note any divisions in the book, and that these are not restricted to the divisions laid out in the table of contents. Lastly, the reader must find out what problems the author is trying to solve.

Interpretive Stage: The second stage of analytical reading involves constructing the author's arguments. This first requires the reader to note and understand any special phrases and terms that the author uses. Once that is done, Adler says that the reader should find and work to understand each proposition that the author advances, as well as the author's support for those propositions.

Critical Stage: In the third stage of analytical reading, Adler directs the reader to critique the book. He asserts that upon understanding the author's propositions and arguments, the reader has been elevated to the author's level of understanding and is now able (and obligated) to judge the book's merit and accuracy. Adler advocates judging books based on the soundness of their arguments. Adler says that one may not disagree with an argument unless one can find fault in its reasoning, facts, or premises, though one is free to dislike it in any case.

The method presented is sometimes called the Structure-Proposition-Evaluation (SPE) method, though this term is not used in the book.

Part 2: The Third Level of Reading: Analytical Reading
Adler explains for whom the book is intended, defines different classes of reading, and tells which classes will be addressed. He also makes a brief argument favoring the Great Books, and explains his reasons for writing How to Read a Book.

There are three types of knowledge: practical, informational, and comprehensive. He discusses the methods of acquiring knowledge, concluding that practical knowledge, though teachable, cannot be truly mastered without experience; that only informational knowledge can be gained by one whose understanding equals the author's; that comprehension (insight) is best learned from who first achieved said understanding – an "original communication".

The idea that communication directly from those who first discovered an idea is the best way of gaining understanding is Adler's argument for reading the Great Books; that any book that does not represent original communication is inferior, as a source, to the original, and that any teacher, save those who discovered the subject he or she teaches, is inferior to the Great Books as a source of comprehension.

Adler spends a good deal of this first section explaining why he was compelled to write this book. He asserts that very few people can read a book for understanding, but that he believes that most are capable of it, given the right instruction and the will to do so. It is his intent to provide that instruction. He takes time to tell the reader about how he believes that the educational system has failed to teach students the art of reading well, up to and including undergraduate, university-level institutions. He concludes that, due to these shortcomings in formal education, it falls upon individuals to cultivate these abilities in themselves. Throughout this section, he relates anecdotes and summaries of his experience in education as support for these assertions.

Part III: Approaches to Different Kinds of Reading Matter
In Part III, Adler briefly discusses the differences in approaching various kinds of literature and suggests reading several other books. He explains a method of approaching the Great Books – read the books that influenced a given author prior to reading works by that author – and gives several examples of that method.

Part IV: The Ultimate Goals of Reading
The last part of the book covers the fourth level of reading: syntopical reading. At this stage, the reader broadens and deepens his or her knowledge on a given subjecte.g., love, war, particle physics, etc.by reading several books on that subject. In the final pages of this part, the author expounds on the philosophical benefits of reading: "growth of the mind", fuller experience as a conscious being...

Reading list (1972 edition)
Appendix A in the 1972 edition provided the following recommended reading list:
 Homer – Iliad, Odyssey
 The Old Testament
 Aeschylus – Tragedies
 Sophocles – Tragedies
 Herodotus – Histories
 Euripides – Tragedies
 Thucydides – History of the Peloponnesian War
 Hippocrates – Medical Writings
 Aristophanes – Comedies
 Plato – Dialogues
 Aristotle – Works
 Epicurus – Letter to Herodotus; Letter to Menoecus
 Euclid – Elements
 Archimedes – Works
 Apollonius of Perga – Conic Sections
 Cicero – Works
 Lucretius – On the Nature of Things
 Virgil – Works
 Horace – Works
 Livy – History of Rome
 Ovid – Works
 Plutarch – Parallel Lives; Moralia
 Tacitus – Histories; Annals; Agricola; Germania
 Nicomachus of Gerasa – Introduction to Arithmetic
 Epictetus – Discourses; Encheiridion
 Ptolemy – Almagest
 Lucian – Works
 Marcus Aurelius – Meditations
 Galen – On the Natural Faculties
 The New Testament
 Plotinus – The Enneads
 St. Augustine – On the Teacher; Confessions; City of God; On Christian Doctrine
 The Song of Roland
 The Nibelungenlied
 The Saga of Burnt Njál
 St. Thomas Aquinas – Summa Theologica
 Dante Alighieri – The Divine Comedy;The New Life; On Monarchy
 Geoffrey Chaucer – Troilus and Criseyde; The Canterbury Tales
 Leonardo da Vinci – Notebooks
 Niccolò Machiavelli – The Prince; Discourses on the First Ten Books of Livy
 Desiderius Erasmus – The Praise of Folly
 Nicolaus Copernicus – On the Revolutions of the Heavenly Spheres
 Thomas More – Utopia
 Martin Luther – Table Talk; Three Treatises
 François Rabelais – Gargantua and Pantagruel
 John Calvin – Institutes of the Christian Religion
 Michel de Montaigne – Essays
 William Gilbert – On the Loadstone and Magnetic Bodies
 Miguel de Cervantes – Don Quixote
 Edmund Spenser – Prothalamion; The Faerie Queene
 Francis Bacon – Essays; Advancement of Learning; Novum Organum, New Atlantis
 William Shakespeare – Poetry and Plays
 Galileo Galilei – Starry Messenger; Dialogues Concerning Two New Sciences
 Johannes Kepler – Epitome of Copernican Astronomy; Concerning the Harmonies of the World
 William Harvey – On the Motion of the Heart and Blood in Animals; On the Circulation of the Blood; On the Generation of Animals
 Thomas Hobbes – Leviathan
 René Descartes – Rules for the Direction of the Mind; Discourse on the Method; Geometry; Meditations on First Philosophy
 John Milton – Works
 Molière – Comedies
 Blaise Pascal – The Provincial Letters; Pensees; Scientific Treatises
 Christiaan Huygens – Treatise on Light
 Benedict de Spinoza – Ethics
 John Locke – Letter Concerning Toleration; Of Civil Government; Essay Concerning Human Understanding; Thoughts Concerning Education
 Jean Baptiste Racine – Tragedies
 Isaac Newton – Mathematical Principles of Natural Philosophy; Optics
 Gottfried Wilhelm Leibniz – Discourse on Metaphysics; New Essays Concerning Human Understanding; Monadology
 Daniel Defoe – Robinson Crusoe
 Jonathan Swift – A Tale of a Tub; Journal to Stella; Gulliver's Travels; A Modest Proposal William Congreve – The Way of the World George Berkeley – Principles of Human Knowledge Alexander Pope – Essay on Criticism; Rape of the Lock; Essay on Man Charles de Secondat, baron de Montesquieu – Persian Letters; Spirit of Laws Voltaire – Letters on the English; Candide; Philosophical Dictionary Henry Fielding – Joseph Andrews; Tom Jones Samuel Johnson – The Vanity of Human Wishes; Dictionary; Rasselas; The Lives of the Poets David Hume – Treatise on Human Nature; Essays Moral and Political; An Enquiry Concerning Human Understanding Jean-Jacques Rousseau – On the Origin of Inequality; On the Political Economy; Emile – or, On Education, The Social Contract Laurence Sterne – Tristram Shandy; A Sentimental Journey through France and Italy Adam Smith – The Theory of Moral Sentiments; The Wealth of Nations Immanuel Kant – Critique of Pure Reason; Fundamental Principles of the Metaphysics of Morals; Critique of Practical Reason; The Science of Right; Critique of Judgment; Perpetual Peace Edward Gibbon – The Decline and Fall of the Roman Empire; Autobiography
 James Boswell – Journal; Life of Samuel Johnson, Ll.D.
 Antoine Laurent Lavoisier – Traité Élémentaire de Chimie (Elements of Chemistry)
 Alexander Hamilton, John Jay, and James Madison – Federalist Papers Jeremy Bentham – Introduction to the Principles of Morals and Legislation; Theory of Fictions
 Johann Wolfgang von Goethe – Faust; Poetry and Truth Jean Baptiste Joseph Fourier – Analytical Theory of Heat
 Georg Wilhelm Friedrich Hegel – Phenomenology of Spirit; Philosophy of Right; Lectures on the Philosophy of History William Wordsworth – Poems
 Samuel Taylor Coleridge – Poems; Biographia Literaria Jane Austen – Pride and Prejudice; Emma Carl von Clausewitz – On War Stendhal – The Red and the Black; The Charterhouse of Parma; On Love
 Lord Byron – Don Juan Arthur Schopenhauer – Studies in Pessimism
 Michael Faraday – Chemical History of a Candle; Experimental Researches in Electricity
 Charles Lyell – Principles of Geology Auguste Comte – The Positive Philosophy
 Honoré de Balzac – Père Goriot; Eugenie Grandet Ralph Waldo Emerson – Representative Men; Essays; Journal
 Nathaniel Hawthorne – The Scarlet Letter Alexis de Tocqueville – Democracy in America John Stuart Mill – A System of Logic; On Liberty; Representative Government; Utilitarianism; The Subjection of Women; Autobiography
 Charles Darwin – The Origin of Species; The Descent of Man; Autobiography Charles Dickens – Pickwick Papers; David Copperfield; Hard Times Claude Bernard – Introduction to the Study of Experimental Medicine Henry David Thoreau – Civil Disobedience; Walden Karl Marx – Capital; Communist Manifesto George Eliot – Adam Bede; Middlemarch Herman Melville – Moby-Dick; Billy Budd Fyodor Dostoevsky – Crime and Punishment; The Idiot; The Brothers Karamazov Gustave Flaubert – Madame Bovary; Three Stories
 Henrik Ibsen – Plays
 Leo Tolstoy – War and Peace; Anna Karenina; What is Art?; Twenty-Three Tales
 Mark Twain – The Adventures of Huckleberry Finn; The Mysterious Stranger William James – The Principles of Psychology; The Varieties of Religious Experience; Pragmatism; Essays in Radical Empiricism Henry James – The American; The Ambassadors Friedrich Wilhelm Nietzsche – Thus Spoke Zarathustra; Beyond Good and Evil; The Genealogy of Morals; The Will to Power Jules Henri Poincaré – Science and Hypothesis; Science and Method Sigmund Freud – The Interpretation of Dreams; Introductory Lectures on Psychoanalysis; Civilization and Its Discontents; New Introductory Lectures on Psychoanalysis
 George Bernard Shaw – Plays and Prefaces
 Max Planck – Origin and Development of the Quantum Theory; Where Is Science Going?; Scientific Autobiography
 Henri Bergson – Time and Free Will; Matter and Memory; Creative Evolution; The Two Sources of Morality and Religion John Dewey – How We Think; Democracy and Education; Experience and Nature; Logic: the Theory of Inquiry Alfred North Whitehead – An Introduction to Mathematics; Science and the Modern World; The Aims of Education and Other Essays; Adventures of Ideas George Santayana – The Life of Reason; Skepticism and Animal Faith; Persons and Places
 Vladimir Lenin – The State and Revolution Marcel Proust – Remembrance of Things Past Bertrand Russell – The Problems of Philosophy; The Analysis of Mind; An Inquiry into Meaning and Truth; Human Knowledge, Its Scope and Limits
 Thomas Mann – The Magic Mountain; Joseph and His Brothers Albert Einstein – The Meaning of Relativity; On the Method of Theoretical Physics; The Evolution of Physics James Joyce – 'The Dead' in Dubliners; A Portrait of the Artist as a Young Man; Ulysses Jacques Maritain – Art and Scholasticism; The Degrees of Knowledge; The Rights of Man and Natural Law; True Humanism Franz Kafka – The Trial; The Castle Arnold J. Toynbee – A Study of History; Civilization on Trial Jean-Paul Sartre – Nausea; No Exit; Being and Nothingness Aleksandr Solzhenitsyn – The First Circle; The Cancer WardPublication data
 Mortimer Adler, How to Read a Book: The Art of Getting a Liberal Education, (1940) 
 1967 edition published with subtitle A Guide to Reading the Great Books  
 1972 revised edition, coauthor Charles Van Doren, New York: Simon and Schuster.  

See also
 How to Read Literature Like a Professor''
 Reading (process)

1940 non-fiction books
Alternative education
Books about books
Books by Mortimer J. Adler
English-language books
Simon & Schuster books